Robert Parry (8 January 1933 – 9 March 2000) was a British Labour Party politician who was Member of Parliament in Liverpool for 27 years.

In 1963, he was elected to Liverpool City Council for the Central ward, one of the safest Labour wards in Liverpool. Parry was elected to Parliament at the 1970 election for Liverpool Exchange and served until his retirement in 1997, from 1974 in Liverpool Scotland Exchange, then from 1983 for Liverpool Riverside. He retired from Parliament at the 1997 general election.

He was known as a hard-line left-winger who opposed any policy moves which he saw as edging Labour away from pure socialism. He once branded Neil Kinnock a "traitor" over the latter's denunciation of the Militant tendency activists who dominated local government on Merseyside. In 1992, Parry was arrested in Beijing when he and his colleagues unfurled a banner in Tiananmen Square protesting the shootings which had taken place there in 1989.

Parry died on 9 March 2000 after battling diabetes.

References

External links
 

1933 births
2000 deaths
British socialists
British Catholics
British people of Irish descent
Labour Party (UK) MPs for English constituencies
Transport and General Workers' Union-sponsored MPs
UK MPs 1970–1974
UK MPs 1974
UK MPs 1974–1979
UK MPs 1979–1983
UK MPs 1983–1987
UK MPs 1987–1992
UK MPs 1992–1997
Politicians from Liverpool
Members of the Parliament of the United Kingdom for Liverpool constituencies